The 2018–19 West Virginia Mountaineers women's basketball team representes West Virginia University during the 2018–19 NCAA Division I women's basketball season. The Mountaineers were coached by eighteenth-year head coach Mike Carey, play their home games at WVU Coliseum and were members of the Big 12 Conference. They finished the season 22–11, 11–7 in Big 12 play to finish in a tie for fourth place. They lost in the quarterfinals of the Big 12 women's tournament to Kansas State. They received an automatic bid to the Women's National Invitation Tournament where they defeated Rider and Villanova in the first and second rounds before losing to Northwestern in the third round.

Previous season
The Mountaineers finished the season 25–12, 8–10 in Big 12 play to finish in sixth place. They advanced to the semifinals of the Big 12 women's tournament where they lost to Texas. They received an automatic bid to the Women's National Invitation Tournament where they defeated Bucknell, Saint Joseph's and James Madison in the first, second and third rounds, St. John's in the quarterfinals before losing to Virginia Tech in the semifinals.

Roster

Schedule

|-
!colspan=12 style=| Exhibition

|-
!colspan=12 style=| Non-conference regular season

|-
!colspan=9 style=| Big 12 regular season

|-
!colspan=9 style=| Big 12 Women's Tournament

|-
!colspan=9 style=| WNIT

Rankings

^Coaches' Poll did not release a second poll at the same time as the AP.

References

West Virginia Mountaineers women's basketball
West Virginia
West Virginia Mountaineers women's b
West Virginia Mountaineers women's b
West Virginia